Raphael de Mello Fernandes Cornelio (born 22 July 1992), known as Raphael Mello, is a Brazilian football player who currently plays for Canelas.

Club career
He made his professional debut in the Campeonato Carioca for Duque de Caxias on 9 March 2014 in a game against Fluminense.

References

External links
 

1992 births
Sportspeople from Niterói
Living people
Brazilian footballers
Brazilian expatriate footballers
Duque de Caxias Futebol Clube players
Bonsucesso Futebol Clube players
U.D. Oliveirense players
Brazilian expatriate sportspeople in Portugal
Expatriate footballers in Portugal
Liga Portugal 2 players
Association football goalkeepers